Les Xipéhuz (1888) is a novella by the writing duo J.-H. Rosny – although it is possible that Rosny aîné was the principal contributor. It describes the fight that threatens humanity, in the beginning of its history, against a new form of intelligent non-organic life, the Xipéhuz, some sort of sentient crystals. It is both his first story set in prehistoric times, and his first science fiction story, although the term did not yet exist.

Plot 
The narrative consists of two parts.  First is a descriptive third-person description of encounters between nomadic tribes and the Xipéhuz, resulting in many deaths from mysterious weapons and powers.  This is followed by meetings of the clans and tribes, ritual sacrifices, and assembly of an army which is defeated by the Xipéhuz.

The second part is the memoir of a wise war chief who observes the Xipéhuz from afar, then carefully approaches them to find out their habits and vulnerabilities.  Despite nearly being killed on several occasions, he discovers how individual Xipéhuz can be killed, and how to overwhelm them.  He then describes a war of attrition where many thousands of warriors encircle the Xipéhuz and reduce their numbers, which have grown into the thousands, sacrificing many men to kill a greater number of the Xipéhuz.  Finally the forest inhabited by the Xipéhuz is razed.

Analysis 
Some contemporary commentators, inspired by later writings, describe the Xipéhuz as extraterrestrial lifeforms. However this is a later interpretation: it could equally be simply a form from another evolutionary line than organic life. The authors do not provide any additional information, merely noting the existence of this non-organic intelligence and its interaction with Neolithic humans. Furthermore, the appearance of a form of non-organic life on Earth (without the extraterrestrial implication) is equally addressed in another work of Rosny Aîné: The Death of Earth.

The text has sometimes been held as the first true science fiction story. "Before Rosny science fiction did not exist," writes Jacques Van Herp, "There only existed a close literature: social science fiction... There was never an event or life-form contrary to what we could otherwise understand, for there was no real science fiction, only when an author "invented" a new science". J.H. Rosny aîné himself said: "I am the only one in France who has given, with "Les Xipéhuz," something new and fantastic, that is to say beyond humanity."

Influences
In the 1980s, the name of the Xipéhuz was taken to designate an alien civilization in the universe of the French role-playing game Empire galactique.

Editions 
 1888, Albert Savine, Paris

Translations 
 as "The Shapes", English translation by Damon Knight, in A Hundred Years of Science Fiction, ed. Damon Knight, (Simon and Schuster, 1968).

References

External links 
 
 

A translation is available in kotava. here.

1888 short stories
Novellas
Belgian speculative fiction works